Lovestruck in the City is a South Korean streaming television series starring Ji Chang-wook and Kim Ji-won. Directed by Park Shin-woo, the series depicts the real love stories of young people who live fiercely in a complex city. This short form drama,  which is the first in a multi-part series titled as City Couple’s Way of Love, was premiered on KakaoTV on December 22, 2020, and aired every Tuesday and Friday at 17:00 (KST). It is available worldwide for streaming on Netflix.

Synopsis
The storyline of the series is in interview format—six people talking about their dating life.

Park Jae-won (Ji Chang-wook), a 32-year-old architect who has a passionate and honest personality. He is not able to forget the woman, whom he calls a "camera thief", who stole his heart and disappeared. Lee Eun-o (Kim Ji-won), a 29-year-old freelance marketer, lives an ordinary life but has an alter ego called Yoon Seon-a. She meets Park Jae-won under her fake identity in Yangyang Beach and ends up falling in love with him.

Choi Kyeong-jun (Kim Min-seok), 29 years old architect, and Seo Rin-i (So Joo-yeon) appear to be a steady couple. Kang Geon (Ryu Kyung-soo), a 29 years old novelist, tends to fall in love with the woman he dates.  Oh Seon-yeong (Han Ji-eun), a 30 years old gym teacher, is a 'serial dater' by self admission.

Cast

Main
 Ji Chang-wook as Park Jae-won, 32-year-old architect.
 Kim Ji-won as Lee Eun-o / Yoon Seon-a, 29-year-old freelance marketer
 Kim Min-seok as Choi Kyeong-jun, 29-year-old architect working in a firm established by his father and uncle; Rin-i's boyfriend.
 So Joo-yeon as Suh Rin-i, a 29-year-old part-timer doing many jobs and going steady with Kyeong-jun. She is a good friend of both Kang Geon and Eun-o.
 Ryu Kyung-soo as Kang Geon, 29-year-old novelist who has not dated for 2 years. He is Eun-o's roommate and best friend.
 Han Ji-eun as Oh Seon-yeong, 30-year-old gym teacher in high school who is a serial dater by self-admission; Geon's ex-girlfriend.

Others
 Son Jong-hak as CEO Park, father of Park Jae-won and uncle of Choi Kyeong-jun
 Hong Soo-joo as Hae-na, an actress
 Lee Suk-hyung as Kang Byung-joon, a police officer

Special appearances 
 Lee Sang-yoon as Go Gyeong-gu
 Lee Sang-woo as Bin, owner of 'Bin-Bin Surfing' (Ep. 1, 3–4, 12)
 Park Jin-joo as Ra-ra, running ramyeon shack on beach front (Ep. 1, 3–4, 12) 
 Choi Min-ho as Oh Dong-sik, a police officer
 Pyo Ye-jin as Yoon Seon-a
 Yang Dae-hyuk as Yoon Byung Soo, Hae-na's manager
 Marychou
 Jung Ji-hyun as customer in Ra-ra's Ramyeon
 Min Sang-woo as customer in Ra-ra's Ramyeon
 Hwang Hee as Cha Chi-hoon (Ep. 17)
 Kim Do-geon as Seon-yeong's ex-boyfriend (Ep. 7)

Episodes

Production

Development
Originally planned for 16 episodes, the series was extended to 17 episodes to show the romance of police officer Oh Dong-sik played by Choi Min-ho.

Casting
In July 2020, Kim Ji-won and Ji Chang-wook were considered for the series. In September 2020, Ji Chang-wook and Kim Ji-won were confirmed to play protagonist in web series. Later in September, Kim Min-seok and So Joo-yeon were also confirmed to play second lead. The script reading was held in September 2020.

Filming
On November 12, the stills photos from filming of the series were released. With the announcement of release date the stills from location were released on November 19, 2020.<ref>{{Cite web|url=https://n.news.naver.com/entertain/article/076/0003661453|title='도시남녀의 사랑법' 지창욱X김지원X한지은 6人6色 무빙 포스터 공개|trans-title=How to love between men and women in the city' Ji Chang-wook x Kim Ji-won x Han Ji-eun 6 people 6 color moving posters released|last=Moon |first=Ji-yeon|access-date=21 November 2020|date=2020-11-20|website=Naver}}</ref> On November 24, 2020, filming was stopped as one of the assistant actors was tested positive for COVID-19. On November 26, it was confirmed that Kim Ji-won tested negative for COVID-19. On December 4, production team released the character posters, and the crew remarked, "We are going to provide a variety of fun by harmonizing stories of strong characters."

Promotion and release
Ji Chang-wook, Kim Min-seok and Ryu Kyung-soo, the lead actors of the drama Lovestruck in the City appeared in  260th episode of the entertainment program Knowing Bros broadcast on December 19, 2020, to promote the series.

On December 2, it was officially announced that in the aftermath of COVID-19, keeping in view the safety of the site and personnel, the first episode of the series, which was scheduled to air on December 8, is postponed to December 22, 2020.

Original soundtrack

Part 1

Part 2

Part 3

Part 4

Part 5

Part 6

Part 7

Part 8

Part 9

Part 10

Part 11

Part 12

Part 13

Reception
Joel Keller of Decider opines that the six characters stand apart so as to be distinctive of each other. Keller feels that the characters of Jae-won and Eun-o are like Ross and Rachel from Friends. Concluding his review, he writes that "Lovestruck in the City'' is a light rom-com that is a good entry into the world of K-dramas, because the character types are very familiar to people used to American and British sitcoms involving will-they-won't-they romances."

References

External links
 
 
 Lovestruck in the City at Daum

KakaoTV original programming
South Korean web series
South Korean romance television series
2020 web series debuts
South Korean romantic comedy television series
Television productions suspended due to the COVID-19 pandemic
Television series by Story & Pictures Media
2021 web series endings
Korean-language Netflix exclusive international distribution programming